Ethynol (or hydroxyacetylene, ethynyl alcohol) is an alkyne–alcohol (ynol) with the formula C2H2O. It is the much-less-stable tautomer of ethenone.

At low temperature in a solid argon matrix it is possible to tautomerise ethenone to form ethynol.

See also
Ethanol (ethyl alcohol)
Ethenol (vinyl alcohol)
Acetylenediol

References

Alkynols